Jean-Philippe-René de La Bléterie (25 February 1696, Rennes – 1 June 1772, Paris) was a French historian and orator.

In 1712 he became a member of Paris oratory. Moreover, he was a professor in Royal college. La Bléterie was elected a member of Académie des Inscriptions et Belles-Lettres in 1742.

His main historical work, "The life of the Emperor Julian" about Roman emperor Julian the Apostate, was written in 1735. It became popular in France and was translated into English (1746) and German (1752), but it also was fiercely criticized by Voltaire. Edward Gibbon used this work when writing "The History of the Decline and Fall of the Roman Empire" and cited it in the chapter on Julian.

In 1748, another work by La Bléterie, "History of Jovian", telling the story of other Roman emperor Jovian, was published. La Bléterie was also an author of a tragedy named "Themistocles".

References

Literature
 Joseph-François Michaud, Louis Gabriel Michaud, Biographie universelle, Paris, C. Desplaces, t. 4, 1854, .
 

18th-century French historians
Oratorians
1696 births
1772 deaths
Writers from Rennes
Academic staff of the Collège de France
French biographers
Members of the Académie des Inscriptions et Belles-Lettres